The Norwegian Film Institute was founded in 1955 to support and develop the Norwegian film industry. On 1 April 2008, it was merged with Norwegian Film Fund, Norwegian Film Development, and Norwegian Film Commission to form the "'new' Norwegian Film Institute" under the auspices of the Royal Norwegian Ministry of Culture.

The NFI is a member of the International Federation of Film Archives, the International Council of Educational Media, European Film Academy, and Scandinavian Films, and represents Norway in Eurimages and the European Audiovisual Observatory.

A large amount of the library's archives are stored in a high-security bunker in Mo i Rana.

See also
 List of film institutes
 Association of European Film Archives and Cinematheques (ACE)

References

 Norwegian Film Institute website (Norwegian)
 About the NFI (English)

Film production companies of Norway
Film archives in Europe
FIAF-affiliated institutions